Savino "Sammy" Forcillo is a retired Canadian politician and a former mayor of Ville-Marie borough in Montreal, Quebec.

Background

He has Italian ancestry and has a degree from the École nationale d'administration publique (ENAP).

Civic Party

He was a member of Jean Drapeau's Civic Party.  He was elected to Montreal's City Council in 1978 in Saint-Jacques, a district with a significant amount of gay residents.  He was re-elected in 1982, but was defeated by RCM candidate Raymond Blain in 1986.  In November 1992 though, he won a by-election in the same district following Blain's death in office.

Vision Montreal

When the Civic Party ceased to exist and merged with Jérôme Choquette's Parti des Montréalais (Montrealers’ Party), Forcillo decided to support Pierre Bourque and join Vision Montreal.  He was re-elected in 1994 and became Deputy Chairman of Montreal Executive Committee.

Team Montreal

In 1997 he was asked to resign from the Executive Committee.  He left Vision Montreal and sat as an Independent, but refused to leave the Executive Committee.

In 1998 he first announced that he would support Jacques Duchesneau for Mayor, but eventually changed his mind.  He ended up being re-elected as a candidate for Jean Doré's Équipe Montréal (Team Montreal).

Union Montreal

In 2000 Forcillo sat again as an Independent and joined Gérald Tremblay's Montreal Island Citizens Union (the party is now known as Union Montréal).

He lost against Vision Montreal's candidate Robert Laramée in 2001, but was re-elected in 2005 representing the merged district of Sainte-Marie—Saint-Jacques.

He has been a Member of Montreal's Executive Committee since then.

On June 25, 2008, Tremblay named Forcillo as the Executive Member responsible for the city's finances following a re-organization that was made necessary following the resignation of the president of the Executive Council, Frank Zampino. 

He ran again in the 2009 Montreal municipal election for Union Montréal in the adjacent district of Peter-McGill.

Retirement

Forcillo announced on August 30, 2013 that he would not be running again in the municipal elections on November 3, 2013.

Footnotes

See also

 Vision Montreal Crisis, 1997

Canadian people of Italian descent
Montreal city councillors
Living people
Year of birth missing (living people)